The GWR 645 Class was a class of  designed by George Armstrong and built at the Wolverhampton railway works of the Great Western Railway (GWR). Thirty-six were constructed between 1872-3, of which three were built for the South Wales Mineral Railway (SWMR), two for the Carmarthen and Cardigan Railway (C&CR) and the remainder for the GWR. In essence, they were saddle tank versions of his GWR 633 Class of 1871. From 1878, a further 72 of the class, partially enlarged, were added in the 1501 numbering sequence. Unlike the originals, the "1501"s had full-length saddle tanks from the start.

Construction
The whole class was delivered in nine lots, as follows:
 645-655, plus one (Lot O, 1872)
 656, 757-763, plus four (Lot P, 1872-3)
 764-775 (Lot Q, 1873)
 1501-1512 (Lot A2, 1878)
 1513-1524 (Lot B2, 1878-9)
 1525-1536 (Lot D2, 1879)
 1537-1548 (Lot E2, 1879–80)
 1549-60 (Lot F2, 1880)
 1801-1812 (Lot G2, 1881)

Three of the un-numbered engines plus No. 767 were sold to the SWMR, and the other two plus No. 655 to the C&CR. The latter three returned to the GWR in 1881, becoming Nos. 902-904.

Dimensions
Half-cabs were added a few years after construction. From 1918 all but eight of the class were rebuilt with Belpaire fireboxes and larger, pannier tanks extending over the smokebox, and the  diameter cylinders became standard.

Use
Most of the 645s and 1501s were allocated to the Northern Division of the GWR. Between 1910 and 1922 three more of them, Nos. 1806, 1811 and 1546, were transferred to the SWMR, and others too went to South Wales. Most were withdrawn in 1930s. Nos. 1531, 1532, 1538 and 1542 passed briefly into British Railways ownership, but all were withdrawn by December 1949.  None have survived into preservation.

See also
 Locomotives of the Great Western Railway
 GWR 0-6-0PT

References

0645
0-6-0ST locomotives
Railway locomotives introduced in 1872
Scrapped locomotives